Kustaa Ahmala (22 September 1867 – 30 August 1933) was a Finnish factory worker, construction worker, journalist and politician, born in Lumijoki. He was a member of the Parliament of Finland from 1917 to 1918, representing the Social Democratic Party of Finland (SDP).

During the 1918 Finnish Civil War Ahmala was a member of the Central Workers' Council of Finland. After the war he was in prison until 1922.

See also 

 List of MPs in Finland imprisoned for political reasons

References

1867 births
1933 deaths
People from Lumijoki
People from Oulu Province (Grand Duchy of Finland)
Social Democratic Party of Finland politicians
Members of the Parliament of Finland (1917–19)
People of the Finnish Civil War (Red side)
Prisoners and detainees of Finland